Peter Donald Styles (born 8 July 1953) is an Australian politician. He was a Country Liberal Party member of the Northern Territory Legislative Assembly from 2008 to 2016, representing the electorate of Sanderson.

Born in Perth, Western Australia, Styles owned and operated a multi-purpose ship and worked as a public servant for the state government, before joining Western Australia Police. In 1981, he moved to Darwin and transferred to the Northern Territory Police where he served for 27 years. In 1991, he was awarded the National Medal, and was upgraded to 1st clasp in 2001.

|}

In 2008, he ran for parliament and was elected to the seat of Sanderson. He first served in the new CLP government as the Government Whip and Parliamentary Secretary assisting the Chief Minister with Multicultural Affairs, Young Territorians and Senior Territorians. He was later appointed to cabinet as Minister for Business; Racing, Gaming and Licensing; Asian Engagement and Trade; Employment and Training; Corporate and Information Services; Multicultural Affairs; Young Territorians; Senior Territorians; and Defence Industries. In February 2016, he was also voted deputy leader of the Country Liberals and became Deputy Chief Minister of the Northern Territory following the resignation from cabinet of Willem Westra van Holthe.

Peter announced his support for voluntary euthanasia in 2010, citing his experience watching his wife Rhonda die from a terminal illness in 1989.

In April 2022, Styles and his wife left the Country Liberal Party, citing "concerns over the future direction of the party".

References

1953 births
Living people
Members of the Northern Territory Legislative Assembly
Country Liberal Party members of the Northern Territory Legislative Assembly
Deputy Chief Ministers of the Northern Territory
Charles Darwin University alumni
Australian police officers
21st-century Australian politicians